Dossett is a surname. Notable people with the surname include:

Chappell Dossett (1883–1961), British actor
John Dossett (born c. 1958), American actor and singer
Martin Dossett (born 1978), American college football player
Myron Dossett (born 1961), American politician

See also
Dorsett